Kamala is a 2019 Indian Malayalam-language thriller film written, produced and directed by Ranjith Sankar. The film stars Ruhani Sharma in the title role, with Aju Varghese playing the male lead. It also features Anoop Menon and Biju Sopanam in supporting roles. The film's music was composed by Anand Madhusoodanan while Shehnad Jalal served as the cinematographer. Kamala was theatrically released on 29 November 2019.

Plot
Kamala follows 36 hours in the life of Safar (Aju Varghese), a real-estate broker, and Kamala (Ruhani Sharma), a mysterious traveller whom Safar met during a brokerage six months prior to the events of the film.  Kamala travels to Athirappilly to meet Safar, who is in the middle of a tribal land deal. Safar takes her to his friend's resort in the middle of Athirappilly forest where he plans to make a move on her. Kamala, who appears to have ulterior motives, goes missing. The movie progresses through Safar's search for Kamala's real identity and her motives.

Cast 
 Aju Varghese as Safar
 Ruhani Sharma as Kamala
 Anoop Menon as Agasthy
 Biju Sopanam as Ravi
 Sunil Sukhada as Pappachan
 Anjana Appukkuttan as Ravi's wife Malathi
 Rajendran as Thoothukudi Raja
 Sreeja Shyam as news anchor Priya
 Gokulan as an activist

Production
The film was produced by Ranjith Sankar for Dreams N Beyond.

The film opened with positive response from critics and praised Aju Varghese's performance.

References

External links 
 

2010s Malayalam-language films